Stomopteryx cirrhocoma is a moth of the family Gelechiidae. It was described by Edward Meyrick in 1914. It is found in South Africa.

The wingspan is about 16 mm. The forewings are dark purplish fuscous. The stigmata are obscure, elongate and blackish, the discal nearly approximated, the plical very obliquely before first discal. The hindwings are grey.

References

Endemic moths of South Africa
Moths described in 1914
Stomopteryx